WhatHouse? is a UK property portal, featuring new homes property for sale across the UK from most major home builders in the UK.

Founded as a magazine in 1978 to provide consumers with information on new homes for sale, as well as interiors and gardens, WhatHouse? was acquired by its present owners in 1988, when it merged with homefinder magazine. WhatHouse? moved online in 2005, becoming www.whathouse.com.

The WhatHouse? Awards, an annual housebuilder awards ceremony which judges the best new homes in the UK, is also part of the WhatHouse? brand and the 34th such ceremony will take place in November 2015.

WhatHouse? is owned by independent publisher WhatHouse Digital Ltd. Its sister company, Globalspan Media Ltd publishes Show House magazine, a monthly magazine for housebuilders and organises the annual WhatHouse? Awards.

Background
The www.whathouse.com portal allows potential buyers to browse and search through a range of new properties.

It covers the affordable housing options for first-time buyers and key workers, such as shared equity shared ownership. There are daily property news and site reviews.

In July 2012, whathouse.com announced a 3-year sponsorship deal with Wolverhampton Wanderers F.C., where the brand name appeared on players' shirts for all first team games.

The WhatHouse? Awards
The WhatHouse? Awards are the longest established new homes awards in the UK. They reward housebuilders and developers across 21 categories.

References

 BBC News, Jersey's new Portelet development wins top UK award
 BBC News, Historic railway development wins awards
 Daily Record, Scotland’s property companies putting best offers on the table
 Wolverhampton Wanderers FC, Major New Sponsor For Wolves

External links
 www.whathouse.com

1978 establishments in the United Kingdom
British real estate websites
Internet properties established in 2005
Magazines established in 1978
Magazines disestablished in 2005
Online magazines published in the United Kingdom
Online magazines with defunct print editions
Real estate companies established in 1978
Defunct magazines published in the United Kingdom